Edinburgh Global Partnerships SCIO, or EGP, is a student-run charity based at the University of Edinburgh that assists in community-led development projects overseas.

EGP's four main aims are:

 To support community led initiatives, working together with people to help them achieve their long-term goals for development.
 To allow volunteers to develop new skills and a wider perspective on the world we live in.
 To promote international understanding through projects that are focussed on building friendship, trust and respect between EGP volunteers and people across the world.
 To establish partnerships with local organisations to encourage volunteers to participate in volunteering in and around Edinburgh.

In March 2012, EGP was awarded a "Global Society Star" Award by Edinburgh University Students' Association (EUSA) in recognition of their contribution to the "global experience on campus, in the local community, and abroad". In April 2019, EGP was awarded EUSA's "Outstanding Contribution to the Global Community Award".

History
EGP was founded as a society at the University of Edinburgh by student Benjamin Carey in 1990 and subsequently achieved charity status later that year. It is thought to be the oldest international volunteer organisation across UK universities. In 2019, EGP ceased to be a society at the University of Edinburgh and became a Scottish Charitable Incorporated Organisation (SCIO).

EGP was originally called H.E.L.P. (Scotland) standing for Humanitarian Education & Long-term Projects.

Committee 
EGP is managed by twelve committee members who are responsible for the running of the charity. Each member is a student who has previously completed an EGP project as a volunteer. Committee members also work on a voluntary basis.

Project Selection and Implementation Process
EGP works by partnering with NGOs and communities from all over the world. Every year, it implements 5/6 projects.

Communities and NGOs apply to work with EGP by submitting a Project Proposal. Over the summer, the Project Researcher and Developer works directly with each applicant and clarifies any questions pertaining to the proposal. The EGP Committee as a whole then compiles and submits further questions to each applicant. When this process is complete, the Committee meets to decide which projects will be selected. Selected projects must be both sustainable and supported by the local community. Projects are selected in September/October.

Once projects have been selected, the Committee recruits 6-10 volunteers for each project. Teams of volunteers work with EGP throughout the academic year, attending weekly trainings on topics such as cultural awareness, safety and health. Each team of volunteers is tasked with raising the funds necessary to implement their project. This is usually done through donations, sponsorships and charity events. In 2019, EGP volunteers participated in the Meadows Marathon. Volunteer fundraising activities were featured in STV Magazine in February 2012.

In the summer, teams travel to their host community to provide unskilled labour and assistance for the implementation of each project.

Past Projects 
Past EGP Projects have included the construction of the New Vision School in Tanzania in 2006, a grinding mill and a house in Zambia in 2005 and the construction of a conventional dairy goat breeding unit in Kisumu, Kenya in 2011. EGP has also been involved in projects addressing the " widespread problem" of "exploitative sexual relations between teachers and student" in Uganda.

Projects 2017/2018 
EGP completed four projects in the summer of 2018.

KEEP, Nepal 
EGP volunteers worked with Kathmandu Environmental Education Project (KEEP) in Dhading District, two hours from Kathmandu, on the reconstruction of a two classroom block which had been destroyed by an earthquake. Families in this rural community are now able to send their children to the school, which gives children from the most disadvantaged backgrounds the opportunity to gain vital life skills, such as literacy and numeracy. The school was constructed with earthquake-resistant materials to prevent future disasters.

Envirocare, Tanzania 
Envirocare is an organisation that has been working for 24 years towards conserving the environment. This project was based in Tunduma, Songwe, in southern Tanzania. EGP volunteers helped to plant trees to replace ones lost through deforestation, and assisted Envirocare in educating the local community on sustainable agroforestry practices. This will contribute to climate change mitigation, as well as reducing hunger and poverty through the use of better quality and more reliable crops.

KAWORIG, Malawi 
The Karonga Women's Rice Group (KAROWIG) was formed with the aims of eradicating poverty amongst the most disadvantaged in the community, particularly women, through the set-up of a rice-selling cooperative. EGP volunteers worked on the construction of a rice warehouse which will be used to store, sort, process and package the rice, and will also be used as a training centre giving business management skills to the women. The warehouse will enable the rice processing business to sustainably expand by acting as a hub, meaning more women will be able to be involved, with the aim being to increase participation to 2,000 women 5 years after completion of the project. Unprocessed rice will be stored in the warehouse, meaning that it'll be available to the women all year round instead of only being seasonally available, giving the women a more stable income source.

MOCHO, Kenya 
Mother of Child Health Organisation (MOCHO) is an NGO located in Rusinga, Kenya. The organisation aims to reduce maternal mortality and mother-child HIV transmission, and to empower young women through education. EGP worked with MOCHO to provide sanitary blocks and feminine hygiene products in schools. Volunteers helped to build two 8-stall toilets in two secondary schools, provide sexual health education for the children in the schools, and provide reusable sanitary products to the girls in each school.

Current Projects 
EGP is working with five NGOs in 2018/2019. Projects set ti be completed in summer 2019.

New Life, Uganda 
EGP has partnered with New Life Pentecostal Church in the Kaberamaido District of Central Uganda. In the summer, volunteers will be working with New Life on the construction of a community health centre in the Kaberamaido District in Central Uganda. Currently, the community's only health centre is an overcrowded one 10 km away. The new health centre will offer services such as sexual education, counselling, referrals and treatments, and New Life is committed to ensuring that services will be provided to everyone "without being limited by prejudice, gender inequality or the stereotypical expectations of others".

The staff, equipment and maintenance of the new health centre will be government-funded, which means that services will be free of charge, with only some specialised treatments requiring a small fee from those who can afford it.

Mitraniketan, India 
EGP has worked various times before with Mitraniketan, an NGO based in Kerala, India. This project will provide fish farms to 25 beneficiary households, each of which will also be given training on the maintenance of the farms. This project has the support of the Government Fisheries Department, and will not only generate income for the families, but also improve nutrition in the area and provide a use for kitchen waste, which will be used to feed the fish.

GREVEO, Malawi 
EGP has partnered with Green Vision Environmental Organization, an NGO based in Salima with a focus on projects that help both people and the environment.

In summer 2019, EGP volunteers will be working on the construction of a solar dryer to develop the fish processing technology of a women's cooperative. Currently, women have to walk long distances to collect firewood for the drying of fish, which also contributes to the depletion of forests in the area. With the introduction of solar technology, post-harvest losses will be reduced and the quality of fish will increase, increasing the income of the cooperative.  

Profits made will not only be used for the income of the women and maintenance of the dryer, but also to spread the technology to other areas, meaning that this project will continue expanding after volunteers leave.

Chiseke, Zambia 
Chiseke Women's Organization is an NGO based in Mufumbwe, Zambia, which provides assistance to disadvantaged people such as orphans and widows, promotes their development and provides them with skills and technical knowledge to help them to find jobs.

In summer 2019, EGP volunteers will help to construct a warehouse for the storing, sorting and processing of groundnuts, beans, sunflower seeds and pumpkin seeds into cooking oil. This will provide work for a group of beneficiaries, and it will also be used as a training centre to provide the beneficiaries with business management skills. It will also provide a much-needed market for the selling of groundnuts by local farmers, and people in the community who cannot afford to buy cooking oil will be able to process their own seeds for a small fee.

The centre will also be zero-waste: by-products will be used as animal feed, and empty oil bottles will be returned to the centre and reused.

Tinada, Kenya 
EGP's final partner is the Tinada Youth Organization, an NGO located in Kisumu, Kenya, with a focus on mental health.

EGP volunteers will be working on the construction of a four-room structure for the mental health services offered by Tinada. In Kenya, mental health tends to be a low priority for the government, making TIYO's work unique and very important in the area. They work in partnership with two hospitals and have a variety of staff, such as psychologists and counsellors, for the treatment of mental health problems. All services will be free of charge for patients, apart from rehabilitation, which will however be subsidised.

The new centre will also include a library with educational books on mental health, which will be accessible to the whole community and thus raise awareness on mental health.

UK partners
EGP is a member of the Scotland's International Development Alliance (SIDA, formerly NIDOS). EGP was featured in the NIDOS March 2012 Newsletter.

EGP is part of the Student International Development Network (SIDN). SIDN is "a partnership between UK based student-led international volunteering groups", and it includes InterVol, Oxford Development Abroad (ODA), Student Volunteering Abroad (SVA) Glasgow and Bristol Volunteers for Development Abroad (BVDA).

See also
 InterVol

References

External links
 Official website

Youth organisations based in Scotland
Charities based in Edinburgh
Clubs and societies of the University of Edinburgh
Development charities based in the United Kingdom
1990 establishments in Scotland